The 2020 Tunisian Super Cup was the  15th edition of the Tunisian Super Cup, a football match contested by the winners of the 2018–19 Tunisian Ligue Professionnelle 1 and 2018–19 Tunisian Cup competitions. The match was played on September 20, 2020 at Stade Hammadi Agrebi in Tunis. between 2018–19 Ligue 1 winners ES Tunis and 2018–19 Tunisian Cup winners CS Sfaxien.

Match

Pre-match 
On February 10, 2019, the Tunisian Football Federation decided to fix the match date to March 15, 2020. However, the match was postponed to September 20, 2020, due to the COVID-19 pandemic in Tunisia. And which will be led by international referee Naim Hosni. The match will be broadcast live on the Télévision Tunisienne 1 and on Al-Kass Sports.

Venue
Stade Hammadi Agrebi, formerly known as Stade 7 Novembre is a multi-purpose stadium in Radès, Tunis, Tunisia about 10 kilometers south-east of the city center of Tunis, in the center of the Olympic City. It is currently used mostly for football matches and it also has facilities for athletics. The stadium holds 65,000 and was built in 2001 for the 2001 Mediterranean Games and is considered to be one of the best stadiums in Africa.

Match details

Broadcasting

See also

 2018–19 Tunisian Ligue Professionnelle 1
 2018–19 Tunisian Cup

References 

Tunisian Super Cup
Supercup